This article displays the rosters for the teams competing at the 2019 Ready Steady Tokyo women's field hockey test event. Each team had to submit 18 players.

Teams

Australia
The following 16 players were named in the Australia squad, which was announced on 6 August.

Head Coach:  Paul Gaudoin

China
The following 16 players were named in the China squad.

Head Coach:  Huang Yongsheng

India
The following 16 players were named in the India squad, which was announced on 26 July.

Head Coach:  Sjoerd Marijne

Japan
The following 16 players were named in the Japan squad, which was announced on 10 August.

Head Coach:  Anthony Farry

References

Sports competitions in Tokyo
August 2019 sports events in Japan
2019 in Japanese sport